Tilok Gogoi (10 April 1923 - 23 July 1985) was an Indian politician. He was a Member of Parliament, representing Assam in the Rajya Sabha the upper house of India's Parliament as a member of the Indian National Congress. He was also a Member of Assam Legislative Assembly for Teok.

References

Rajya Sabha members from Assam
Indian National Congress politicians
1923 births
1985 deaths